"Hummingbird" is a song by American soft rock duo Seals and Crofts, released as a single in 1973. It was the second single from their fourth studio album, Summer Breeze, the follow-up to the LP's title track.

Background
The “hummingbird” in the song’s lyrics is a metaphor for Baha'u'llah, Prophet of the Baha'i Faith.  The album version contains a prologue that is omitted from the shorter radio edit.

The song reached No. 20 on the U.S. Billboard Hot 100 and number 15 on the Cash Box Top 100.  "Hummingbird" was a bigger Adult Contemporary hit, reaching number 12 on the U.S. chart and number three in Canada.

Harvey Brooks played bass on this song and talks about it in this interview for No Treble.

Chart performance

Weekly charts

Year-end charts

References

External links
 

1973 singles
Seals and Crofts songs
Songs written by James Seals
1972 songs
Warner Records singles